KFRA (1390 AM) is a 500 watt Daytime/244 watt nighttime non-directional station in Franklin, Louisiana, currently relay broadcasting most of radio station KBZE.

External links

Radio stations in Louisiana
Urban adult contemporary radio stations in the United States